Zisis Vryzas (born 9 November 1973) is a Greek former professional footballer who played as a forward for various teams in Greece and abroad, as well as for the Greece national football team, when they won the Euro 2004. After his retirement, he worked for PAOK as technical director, and for a brief period, took up the position of president, following Theodoros Zagorakis' resignation. On 16 August 2010, Vryzas became the assistant coach of the Greece national team.

Club career

Skoda Xanthi
Born in Kavala, Vryzas started his football career at Skoda Xanthi where his talent attracted the interest of stronger domestic as well as foreign Clubs.

PAOK
In 1996, Vryzas was signed by PAOK FC, where he enjoyed great popularity among PAOK fans for his power, determination and devotion with which they describe his game and for scoring a handful of very important goals. The most significant memory of his career with PAOK FC occurred in the first round second leg of the 1997–98 UEFA Cup. It was the fantastic equaliser (1–1 on the night, 2–1 on aggregate) he scored in the 87th minute against Arsenal at Highbury, which resulted in a notable, historic qualification for PAOK against the English giants who managed to win the double in the Premier League that same season.

Perugia
In 2000, while PAOK were struggling with endless financial problems due to the ineffective policy of debts and mismanagement of the main share-holder, consequently Vryzas was sold to the Italian Serie A relegation battlers A.C. Perugia. In Perugia, he once again gained popularity among the local fans for his work-rate and immediate adjustment to the new environment, which proved to be a key-factor for Perugia's constant presence in the Serie A, under the management of Serse Cosmi.

Fiorentina
His very positive performances with Perugia earned him a more lucrative contract at the once mighty Fiorentina in 2003, at that time struggling in Serie B; ironically, the Viola returned to Serie A at the expense of Perugia, through a two-legged playoff, as they had finished sixth in Serie B that season, while Perugia had finished at 15th place in Serie A.

Loan to Celta Vigo
In 2004, the Greek striker joined Celta Vigo in a loan deal from Fiorentina with an option for the deal to become permanent.

Torino
In January 2006 the Greek striker eventually departed again to join another popular Club of northern Italy, Torino F.C. until the end of his contract.

Return to Skoda Xanthi
In the summer of 2006, Vryzas returned to Greece and in particular to the club where he started his professional career, Skoda Xanthi.

Return to PAOK
In June 2007, he finally decided to join the "club of his heart" and signed a two-year contract with PAOK FC. There he found his old companion and team-mate, at both PAOK and the Greece National Team during the 1990s, Theodoros Zagorakis – who had only just taken the reins of the club. Vryzas stated upon his return that PAOK F.C. was an emotional choice for him, and the last stop in his career should only be in the club he loved and supported since childhood. On 6 January 2008, Vryzas played his last game of his successful football career at the home game of PAOK FC against Larissa F.C. at the legendary ground of PAOK FC Toumba Stadium, a game which PAOK won 1–0, with a goal scored by Lazaros Christodoulopoulos, a goal which the scorer dedicated to Vryzas. Vryzas, actually came in as a substitution in the 82nd minute of the game to replace Christodoulopoulos and was honoured by the fans with a standing ovation and with a long singing of his name, which lasted until the end of the game as Vryzas thanked them during his "goodbye round" of the stadium.

International career
Vryzas debuted for Greece in October 1994 in a home Euro 1996 qualifier against Finland, a 4–0 victory. He scored his first goal three months later, in a friendly against Cyprus in Larnaca, but had to wait until 2004 in Portugal to take part in a final stage of a tournament.

Although not a very prolific scorer, Vryzas' tenacious work ethic, his restless battles with the opposing defenders, his talent to create chances and open spaces for his attacking partners, in addition to his aerial ability and passing skills made him a valuable member of all the Clubs he played for, as well as the Greece national team when they won the European Championship in 2004. He was a notable member of the starting eleven in Greece's victorious team and scored a tremendously important goal, a fine chip over the keeper, in Greece's 2–1 loss to Russia. That goal sent the tournament underdogs into the quarter-final, on a better goal average against contenders Spain.

Post-playing career
On 8 January 2008, Vryzas was officially appointed as the Technical Director of PAOK FC. He joined the club's board along with former team-mate and current chairman of the club, Theodoros Zagorakis. During his first steps in his new career he succeeded in bringing to PAOK Pablo Contreras, Zlatan Muslimović, Vieirinha, Lino and Pablo Garcia in 2008.
He succeeded selling Lazaros Christodoulopoulos and Christos Melissis to Panathinaikos FC for €4,300,000 and Daniel Fernandes to VfL Bochum for €1,100,000.

In July 2009, he continued and succeeded in bringing to PAOK Mirko Savini, Olivier Sorlin, Lucio Filomeno, Bruno Cirillo, Mohammed Abubakari and Vasilios Koutsianikoulis (a hot prospect of Greek football).

On 9 October 2009, Vryzas was appointed PAOK FC Chairman, following Zagorakis resignation for personal reasons.

On 11 August 2010, Vryzas resigned from the position of director of football from PAOK FC.

Five days later, he became a colleague of Fernando Santos, the head coach of Greece national football team.

In 2012 he returned to PAOK FC as president and from the summer of 2014 he became Technical Director. Zisis Vryzas is a misunderstanding figure in the history of the club. On 2010 PAOK FC were on the verge of economic collapse. There was also the scenario of the collapse of the Association in lower categories, under the weight of debts. With smart moves created a low budget team coached by Giorgos Donis, which could cope economically keeping the prestige of the club up after playing in European competitions, namely the UEFA Europa League. Somewhere in mid summer of 2012, and while he had erected a Greek-Russian namely Ivan Savvides entered the club. What happened was considered as a movement from God, after Savvides had several million euro in his pocket and intended to combine its presence in Greece with sporting activities and in particular with PAOK FC. Nevertheless, Vryzas, managed and made smart moves by bringing all these years from different positions (President, Technical Director) international players who became a major asset for the club.

On 18 February 2015, few days after the heavy defeat from Atromitos, Zisis Vryzas was made available by Ivan Savvides his resignation from the post of technical director of PAOK. However, formal notice to terminate the cooperation did not exist. However, some time ago it became known through information that the club has completed all the nominal procedures for his withdrawal from the Board of Directors. He later joined Veria as technical director.

On 7 May 2015, Vryzas has been announced as the new Technical Football Director of Super League club Veria. On 4 July 2016, Vryzas resigned from the position of director of football from Veria.

On 9 December 2016, the Temporary Administrative Committee of Hellenic Football Federation stated that Zisis Vryzas takes all responsibilities of the Directorate of Competition, which, among other things, is also responsible for the organization of the Greek Cup. On 7 November 2018, Vryzas solved his contract with Hellenic Football Federation.

Career statistics

Honours
Perugia
 Intertoto Cup: 2003

Greece
 UEFA European Football Championship: 2004

References

1973 births
Living people
Footballers from Kavala
Greek Macedonians
Greek footballers
Greece international footballers
Association football forwards
Xanthi F.C. players
PAOK FC players
RC Celta de Vigo players
ACF Fiorentina players
La Liga players
A.C. Perugia Calcio players
Torino F.C. players
Greek expatriate footballers
Greek expatriate sportspeople in Italy
Greek expatriate sportspeople in Spain
Expatriate footballers in Italy
Expatriate footballers in Spain
Serie A players
Serie B players
UEFA Euro 2004 players
UEFA European Championship-winning players
2005 FIFA Confederations Cup players
Super League Greece players
PAOK FC non-playing staff
PAOK F.C. presidents